Bovanenkovo Airport  is an airport in Yamalo-Nenets Autonomous Okrug, Russia serving the Bovanenkovo gas field. It handles medium-sized airliners. The airport contains ample tarmac space and is well-maintained.

Airlines and destinations

References 

Airports built in the Soviet Union
Airports in Yamalo-Nenets Autonomous Okrug